Sociedade Esportiva Pauferrense, commonly known as Pauferrense, is a Brazilian football club based in Pau dos Ferros, Rio Grande do Norte state. They competed in the Série C once.

History
The club was founded on May 1, 1995. They competed in the Série C in 1996, when they were eliminated in the Second Stage of the competition.

Stadium
Sociedade Esportiva Pauferrense play their home games at Estádio Nove de Janeiro. The stadium has a maximum capacity of 10,000 people.

References

Football clubs in Rio Grande do Norte
Association football clubs established in 1995
1995 establishments in Brazil